Parisina (also known as Parisina d'Este) is an opera (tragedia lirica), in three acts by Gaetano Donizetti. Felice Romani wrote the Italian libretto after Byron's 1816 poem Parisina.

The characters of Parisina and Duke Azzo in both Byron's poem and Donizetti's opera are very loosely based on the historical figures of Parisina Malatesta (the daughter of Andrea Malatesta) and Niccolò III d'Este.

Parisina premiered on 17 March 1833 at the Teatro della Pergola in Florence. A performance at the Teatro Argentina in Rome is the setting for a key scene in chapter 34 of the 1844 novel The Count of Monte Cristo by Alexandre Dumas.

Roles

Synopsis 
Place: Ferrara
Time: the 15th centuryAct 1

In Duke Azzo's palace, Ernesto and other nobles await his arrival (È desto il duca?). Azzo appears and tells Ernesto about his fear that his wife, Parisina, has betrayed him for another man, as had his first wife, Matilde. When Azzo leaves, Ugo arrives. Ugo, who was raised by Ernesto, was once a favourite of Azzo but was later exiled. Ernesto is overcome by fear when he sees his foster son, knowing that his exile had not ended and Azzo was still angry at him. His fear worsens when Ugo reveals his love for Parisina to him.

Meanwhile, Parisina with her faithful Imelda and her other handmaids are resting in the garden. They hear knights arriving for the festivities, amongst whom is Ugo. When Parisina and Ugo are alone, she urges him to flee. They are interrupted by the arrival of the Duke. In a fury, he demands to know what Ugo is doing there. Parisina defends Ugo which only increases the Duke's anger (Il difende! E in sua difesa tanto adopra).

By the shores of the River Po. Azzo tells Ugo he may remain for the festivities, just as Ugo and his men are about to get on their boat. Parisina follows her husband and courtiers to the palace for the banquet (Vieni, vieni, e in sereno sembiante). Ernesto, Ugo, and Parisina are consumed by fear, while Azzo is consumed by his anger (Ma divoro nel cor tremante un timor/furor che non posso frenar).

Act 2
In Parisina's room, Imelda and the other handmaids are talking about the banquet (Lieta era dessa). They express their joy at Parisina's happiness and Azzo's apparent tranquillity. Imelda, however, is fearful of what may happen. Parisina enters. She is tired and falls asleep. Her maids leave her alone, but Azzo enters the room to spy on her. In a dream, Parisina, believing that Ugo is in the room calls out to him and tells him they must flee together. Azzo shouts in fury waking Parisina, and he accuses her of being unfaithful. Parisina, now desperate, admits her love for Ugo. Azzo is about to kill her, but then holds back (Non pentirti, mi ferisci).

In another room in the palace and waiting for the banquet to begin, Ugo is troubled that Parisina has not yet appeared. Soldiers enter and order Ugo to follow them to the Duke who asks him if Parisina's confession is true. Azzo is about to condemn Ugo to death when Ernesto intervenes. He reveals that Ugo is Duke Azzo's son by his first marriage. His mother had entrusted him to Ernesto after she had been banished from the court. Azzo recognizes Ugo as his son, and appears to rescind the order for his death.

Act 3
In the palace chapel a choir is heard (Muta, insensibile). Parisina prays that Ugo will be saved. Imelda arrives bringing a letter from Ugo, asking Parisina to escape with him. Parisina hesitates, but then decides to join him. Funeral music is heard. Azzo appears, blocks Parisina's way, and then shows her Ugo's corpse. Parisina is overcome by horror (Ugo è spento! A me si renda!) and falls dead.

Recordings

References
Notes

Sources
Allitt, John Stewart (1991), Donizetti: in the light of Romanticism and the teaching of Johann Simon Mayr, Shaftesbury: Element Books, Ltd (UK); Rockport, MA: Element, Inc.(USA)
Ashbrook, William (1982), Donizetti and His Operas, Cambridge University Press.  
Ashbrook, William  (1998), "Donizetti, Gaetano" in Stanley Sadie  (Ed.),  The New Grove Dictionary of Opera, Vol. One. London: Macmillan Publishers, Inc.   
Ashbrook, William and Sarah Hibberd (2001), in  Holden, Amanda (Ed.), The New Penguin Opera Guide, New York: Penguin Putnam. .  pp. 224 – 247.
Black, John (1982), Donizetti’s Operas in Naples, 1822—1848. London: The Donizetti Society.

Loewenberg, Alfred (1970). Annals of Opera, 1597-1940, 2nd edition.  Rowman and Littlefield
Osborne, Charles, (1994),  The Bel Canto Operas of Rossini, Donizetti, and Bellini,  Portland, Oregon: Amadeus Press. 
Sadie, Stanley, (Ed.); John Tyrell (Exec. Ed.) (2004), The New Grove Dictionary of Music and Musicians.  2nd edition. London: Macmillan.    (hardcover).   (eBook).
 Weinstock, Herbert (1963), Donizetti and the World of Opera in Italy, Paris, and Vienna in the First Half of the Nineteenth Century'', New York: Pantheon Books.

External links
  Donizetti Society (London) website
 

Italian-language operas
Operas by Gaetano Donizetti
Operas
1833 operas
Operas based on literature
Music based on poems
Adaptations of works by Lord Byron
Operas set in Italy
Libretti by Felice Romani
Cultural depictions of Parisina Malatesta